Puntius sealei is a species of cyprinid fish endemic to Borneo where it is an inhabitant of streams and rivers.  This species can reach a length of  TL.

References

sealei
Fish described in 1933